Xunyi is a county in the central part of Shaanxi province, China, bordering Gansu province to the north and northwest. It is the northernmost county-level division of Xianyang City. The county is noted for its apple orchards producing the "Malan Red", a variety of red Fuji apple named after the Malan Red Army site. Besides apples, the economy relies on coal and petroleum exploitation.

Present day Xunyi is located at the same location as the historic Bin city. Xunyi is also home to the  Xunyi Pagoda, built in 1059.

The county was one of the communist strongholds during the Long March.

Administrative divisions
As 2020, Xunyi is divided in  9 towns and 1 subdistrict.
Towns

Climate

Transportation
G69 Yinchuan–Baise Expressway
G3511 Heze–Baoji Expressway (under construction as of January 2020)
China National Highway 211

References

County-level divisions of Shaanxi
Xianyang